E.B. Campbell Hydroelectric Station is a hydroelectric station on the Saskatchewan River owned by SaskPower, located near Carrot River, Saskatchewan, Canada.  The dam created the artificial Tobin Lake.  The station is named after Bruce Campbell, a former president of SaskPower who was also the assistant chief engineer during the construction of the station.  Until 1988, it was named Squaw Rapids Dam.

The dam altered water levels in the Saskatchewan River, which made the area uninhabitable for a lot of animals. The impact on fishers and trappers was acknowledged in 1989 with a payment of 15 million dollars. The environmental impact of the dam and power station continues however.

Description 

The E.B. Campbell Hydroelectric Station consists of:
six 32 net MW unit (commissioned in 1963 to 1964)
two 42 net MW units (commissioned in 1966)

See also 

 SaskPower
 List of dams and reservoirs in Canada

References

External links 
  SaskPower Station Description

Hydroelectric power stations in Saskatchewan
Moose Range No. 486, Saskatchewan
SaskPower
Dams in the Saskatchewan River basin
Saskatchewan River